Cyclocybe is a genus of fungi belonging to the family Strophariaceae. The genus has a cosmopolitan distribution.

Species
The following species are recognised in the genus Cyclocybe:
 Cyclocybe aegerita 
 Cyclocybe cylindracea 
 Cyclocybe erebia 
 Cyclocybe erebioides 
 Cyclocybe lateritia 
 Cyclocybe mnichovicensis 
 Cyclocybe parasitica 
 Cyclocybe pragensis 
 Cyclocybe salicaceicola 
 Cyclocybe squamulosa

References

Fungi